The 2021–22 season is the 33rd professional football season in Farul Constanța's existence, and the 19th in the top-flight of Romanian football. Farul competes in Liga I and in the Cupa României.On 21 June 2021, Gheorghe Hagi (owner and founder of Viitorul Constanța), Gheorghe Popescu (chairman of Viitorul) and Ciprian Marica (owner of Farul Constanța) announced in a press conference that their teams have merged. The club that would continue in the Liga I will be FCV ('V' from 'Viitorul') Farul. Farul will play in the Liga I on Viitorul's place and its home matches will be disputed on Viitorul Stadium, due to Farul Stadium advance state of degradation.

Previous season positions

Viitorul Constanța

Farul Constanța

Season overview

June
On 21 June 2021, Gheorghe Hagi, owner and founder of Viitorul Constanța, Gheorghe Popescu, chairman of Viitorul, and Ciprian Marica, owner of Farul Constanța, announced in a press conference that their teams have merged. The club that would continue in the Liga I will be FCV ('V' from 'Viitorul') Farul. Farul will play its home matches on the Viitorul Stadium, as the old Farul Stadium will be in a rebuilding process.

On 22 June 2021 the club announced that they signed the Romanian goalkeeper Marian Aioani.

On 24 June 2021 the club announced that they signed the Romanian defender Ionuț Larie. Since making his debut in the first division in 2006, Larie has amassed over 300 matches in the competition for FC Farul Constanța, FC Viitorul Constanța, CFR Cluj, FCSB and Gaz Metan Mediaș, among others. With CFR Cluj he won the Cupa României in 2016.On the dame day, the club announced that they signed the Romanian forward Adrian Petre.

July
On 1 July 2021 the club announced that they signed the Brazilian midfielder Romário Pires. Since making his debut in the first division in 2012,  "Romică" Pires has amassed over 100 matches in the competition for Gloria Bistrița, Petrolul Ploiești, Astra Giurgiu and Hermannstadt. With Petrolul Ploiești he won the Cupa României in 2013. His honours also include the Israel State Cup with Maccabi Haifa.

On 5 July FC Farul Constanța and Dnipro-1 agreed to transfer Valentin Cojocaru to the Ukrainian club for a fee of  €100,000.

On 7 July the club announced that they signed the Romanian midfielder Florin Purece.He began his senior career in 2009 with UTA Arad, he moved to Concordia Chiajna and went on to make a name for himself at Viitorul Constanța.With Viitorul Constanța he won the 2016–17 Liga I. In 2017, he signed with Hapoel Ra'anana in Israel. After three additional seasons in Poland playing for Termalica Nieciecza, he returned to his native country in 2020. Purece signed a season-long deal at Sepsi OSK Sfântu Gheorghe.

On 9 July the club announced that they signed the Spanish forward Jefté Betancor. In last season he was the top-scorer of FC Voluntari.

On 10 July George Ganea scored for Romania in a friendly match against Saudi Arabia.

On 18 July Farul drew 0–0 away against UTA Arad.

On 25 July the club won the match against Gaz Metan Mediaș 2-0. Jefté Betancor and Adrian Petre scored for Viitorul.

On 26 July the club announced that they signed the Romanian goalkeeper Laurențiu Brănescu.Born in Râmnicu Vâlcea, Romania, Brănescu began his career with the youth academy of local side CSM Râmnicu Vâlcea in 2000. He remained within the club's youth sector until January 2011, when he caught the attention of Serie A side, Juventus Football Club. Brănescu originally was scouted by the Turin-based club during the summer of 2010, but did not officially complete his transfer to Italy until 24 January 2011. On 24 January 2011, Brănescu officially transferred from Râmnicu Vâlcea to Juventus Upon joining the Turin-based club, Brănescu was instantaneously inserted into the club's youth sector, where he quickly established himself as the club's first choice goalkeeper. Along with his regularity in the youth academy, Brănescu also served as Juventus' fourth choice goalkeeper for the 2012-13 Serie A campaign, behind Gianluigi Buffon, Marco Storari and Rubinho, earning 6 first team call-ups during league play, and also was a part of the club's 2012–13 UEFA Champions League roster. He also played for S.S. Juve Stabia (Italy), Virtus Lanciano (Italy), Szombathelyi Haladás (Hungary), Omonia (Cyprus), Dinamo București (Romania), HNK Gorica (Croatia), Žalgiris Vilnius (Lithuania), Kilmarnock (Scotland) and Politehnica Iași (Romania). He signed a three years contract with Farul.

On 30 July Farul drew 0–0 away against FC Rapid București.

August

On 9 August the club won the match against Sepsi OSK Sfântu Gheorghe 1-0. Jefté Betancor scored for Farul.

On 13 August, the match against CFR Cluj was lost 1-0.

On 20 August the club won the match against FC Dinamo București 3-0. Jefté Betancor and George Ganea scored for Farul. 	

On 27 August Farul drew 0–0 away against FC U Craiova 1948.Adrian Petre and George Ganea scored for Farul.

September

On 13 September Farul won the match against FC Academica Clinceni 5-0. Jefté Betancor , Adrian Petre and Enes Sali scored for Farul. On 13 September that year, Sali became the youngest player to score in the Liga I at 15 years, six months and 21 days, after netting the last goal in a 5–0 defeat of Academica Clinceni.

On 18 September, the match against AFC Chindia Târgoviște was lost 2-0.

On 22 September, the match against Sepsi OSK Sfântu Gheorghe was lost 1-0.

On 26 September, Farul won the match against CS Mioveni 2-1. Betancor and Ciobanu scored for Farul.

October

On 3 October, the match against FC Voluntari was lost 1-0.

On 13 October, FC Farul Constanța appointed Radu Paligora as the new doctor of the team. Radu Paligora was doctor at teams such as FCSB, Al Hilal SFC, Ludogorets Razgrad, Al-Wasl F.C. and CFR Cluj.

On 17 October, the match against FC Argeș Pitești was lost 2-1. Jefté Betancor scored for Farul.

On 29 October, the match against FC Botoșani was won 2-0. Damien Dussaut and Adrian Petre scored for Farul.

November
On 4 November, the match against FCSB was lost 1-0.

On 3 November 2021, aged 15, Sali was selected by the Romania national team for the 2022 FIFA World Cup qualifiers against Iceland and Liechtenstein. Romanian newspaper Gazeta Sporturilor later reported that Canada had also approached him for a possible call up.

Sali made his senior debut on 14 November by coming on as an 82nd minute substitute for Andrei Ivan in the latter match, and became the youngest European player to appear in a competitive game at 15 years and 264 days (Lucas Knecht holds the record for any player in any match type).

On 7 November, the match against CS Universitatea Craiova was won 1-0. Adrian Petre scored for Farul.

Club officials

Board of directors

 Last updated: 1 July 2021
 Source: Board of directors (Hagi Academy)
 Source: Board of directors (Viitorul)

Current technical staff

 Last updated: 1 July 2021
 Source: 
 Source: Medical staff 
 Source: Press release

Players

Current squad

Transfers

Players from Farul

Players from Viitorul

In

Out

Loans out

Friendly matches

Competitions

Liga I

Regular season

Table

Results by round

Matches

Cupa României

Round of 32

Statistics

Appearances and goals

                      

! colspan="12" style="background:#DCDCDC; text-align:center" | Players transferred out during the season
|-

|}

Squad statistics

Goalscorers

Hat-tricks

Clean sheets

Disciplinary record

List of international goals scored by Farul's players

Managerial statistics (2021-22 season)

See also
 2021–22 Cupa României
 2021–22 Liga I

References

Farul, Constanța, FC
FCV Farul Constanța